James McMullen (November 29, 1833 – March 18, 1913) was a Canadian politician.

Born in County Monaghan, Ireland, the second son of Archibald McMullen and Mary Moorehead, he emigrated to Canada West with his family in 1846 setting near Fergus, Ontario. Educated at the Common School, McMullen was a merchant in Mount Forest, Ontario.

He was a director and vice-president of the Georgian Bay and Wellington Railway, a director of the Grand Trunk, Georgian Bay and Lake Erie Railway, and a director of the Dominion Life Insurance Company. He was a city councillor and reeve before being elected to the House of Commons of Canada for the riding of Wellington North in an 1880 by-election. A Liberal, he was re-elected in the 1887, 1891, 1896 elections. He was defeated in the 1900 election.

McMullen was summoned to the Senate of Canada on the advice of Prime Minister Wilfrid Laurier in 1902 representing the senatorial division of North Wellington. He served until his death in 1913.

McMullen was married to Mary Ann Dunbar in 1858. His descendants include the mathematician Curtis McMullen.

References

 
 

Canadian senators from Ontario
Irish emigrants to pre-Confederation Ontario
Liberal Party of Canada MPs
Liberal Party of Canada senators
Members of the House of Commons of Canada from Ontario
People from Wellington County, Ontario
1833 births
1913 deaths
Immigrants to the Province of Canada